This is a list of golf courses designed by Jack Nicklaus and his company Nicklaus Design, one of the largest golf design practices in the world.

In the mid-1960s, Pete Dye initially requested Nicklaus' advice for the design of The Golf Club in suburban Columbus, Ohio. His first design Harbour Town Golf Links, co-credited with Dye, was opened for play in 1969. A subsequent early, yet more prominent design was Muirfield Village Golf Club in Dublin, Ohio which opened in 1974 and has hosted the Memorial Tournament since its inception in 1976. This course has also hosted the 1987 Ryder Cup and the 1998 Solheim Cup matches. For the first few years, all of his projects were co-designs with either Pete Dye or Desmond Muirhead.

Nicklaus is in partnership with his four sons and his son-in-law through their company, Nicklaus Design. The company has designed over 410 courses in 45 countries, over 1% of all the courses in the world. Although most Nicklaus-designed courses are in the United States, he has also designed many in Asia, Australia, Canada, Europe, and Mexico.

Nicklaus-designed courses 

An up to date list can be found via Nicklaus Design's database:

1970s

 John's Island - South Course, Vero Beach, FL 1970
 Wabeek Country Club, Bloomfield Hills, MI 1972
 Golf Center at Kings Island - Bruin, Mason, OH 1973
 Golf Center at Kings Island - Grizzly, Mason, OH 1973
 Mayacoo Lakes Country Club, West Palm Beach, FL 1973
 New Saint Andrews Golf Club, Otawara, Tochigi, Japan  1973
 Bay Valley Golf Course, Bay City, MI 1973
 The Country Club at Muirfield Village - Dublin, OH 1974
 Glen Abbey Golf Course, Oakville, Ontario Canada  1976
 La Moraleja Golf Club, Alcobendas, Madrid, Spain  1976
 Shoal Creek Golf and Country Club, Birmingham, AL 1976
 The Australian Golf Club, Rosebery, New South Wales, Australia  1977 (redesign)
 The Greenbrier – The Greenbrier Course, White Sulphur Springs, WV 1978 (redesign)

1980s

 Bear's Paw Country Club, Naples, FL 1980
 Lochinvar Golf Club, Houston, TX 1980
 Annandale Golf Club, Madison, MS 1981
 Castle Pines Golf Club, Castle Rock, CO 1981
 The Club at Morningside, Rancho Mirage, CA 1981
 The Hills of Lakeway - The Hills Country Club Course, Austin, TX 1981
 Sailfish Point Golf Club, Stuart, FL 1981
 Turtle Point Golf Club, Kiawah Island, SC 1981
 Bear Creek Golf Club, Murrieta, CA 1982
 The Country Club at Muirfield Village, Dublin, OH 1982
 Atlanta Country Club, Atlanta, GA 1983 (redesign)
 Park Meadows Country Club, Park City, UT 1983
 Bear Lakes Country Club, West Palm Beach, FL 1984
 Country Club of the Rockies, Edwards, CO 1984
 Desert Highlands, Scottsdale, AZ  1984
 Elk River Golf Club, Banner Elk, NC 1984
 Grand Cypress Golf Club, Orlando, FL  1984
 Grand Traverse Resort, Acme, MI 1984
 La Paloma Country Club, Tucson, AZ 1984
 The Loxahatchee Club, Jupiter, FL 1984
 Meridian Golf Club, Englewood, CO 1984
 Bear Lakes Country Club - Lakes Course, West Palm Beach, FL 1985
 Britannia Golf and Beach Club, Grand Cayman, Cayman Islands, British West Indies  1985
 St. Andrews Golf Club, Hastings-on-Hudson, NY 1985 (redesign)
 The Country Club at Castle Pines, Castle Rock, CO 1986
 The Country Club of Louisiana, Baton Rouge, LA 1986
 Dallas Athletic Club - Blue Course, Dallas, TX 1986
 St. Mellion Hotel Golf & Country Club, Cornwall, England  1986
 Valhalla Golf Club, Louisville, KY 1986
 Bear Lakes Country Club - Links Course, West Palm Beach, FL 1987
 Breckenridge Golf Club, Breckenridge, CO 1987
 Country Club of The South, Alpharetta, GA 1987
 Daufuskie Island Club & Resort - Melrose Course, Hilton Head Island, SC 1987
 Desert Mountain - Cochise, Scottsdale, AZ 1987
 Desert Mountain - Renegade, Scottsdale, AZ 1987
 PGA West - Private Course, La Quinta, CA 1987
 PGA West - Resort Course, La Quinta, CA 1987
 English Turn Golf & Country Club, New Orleans, LA 1988
 Golf Club Crans-Sur-Sierre, Crans-Sur-Sierre, Valais, Switzerland  1988
 Golf Club Gut Altentann, Henndorf, Salzburg, Austria  1988
 Grand Cypress Golf Club - New Course, Orlando, FL 1988
 Kauai Lagoons - Kiele Course, Lihue, HI 1988
 Pawleys Plantation, Pawleys Island, SC 1988
 Ptarmigan Country Club, Fort Collins, CO 1988
 Richland Country Club, Nashville, TN  1988
 Sunny Field Golf Club, Gozenyama, Ibaraki, Japan  1988
 Avila Golf & Country Club, Tampa, FL 1989
 Dallas Athletic Club - Gold Course, Mesquite, TX 1989
 Desert Mountain - Geronimo, Scottsdale, AZ 1989
 Eagle Oaks Golf Club, Farmingdale, NJ 1989
 Kauai Lagoons - Mokihana Course, Lihue, HI 1989
 The Long Bay Club, Longs, SC 1989
 National Golf Club, Village of Pinehurst, NC 1989
 Sherwood Country Club, Thousand Oaks, CA 1989
 Shimonoseki Golden Golf Club, Shimonoseki, Yamaguchi, Japan  1989
 St. Creek Golf Club, Asuke, Aichi, Japan  1989
 Sycamore Hills Golf Club, Fort Wayne, IN 1989
 Wynstone Golf Club, North Barrington, IL 1989

1990s

 Country Club of Landfall, Wilmington, NC 1990
 Governors Club, Chapel Hill, NC 1990
 Japan Memorial Golf Club, Yakawa-cho, Nara, Japan  1990
 Oakmont Golf Club, Yamazoe, Nara, Japan  1990
 PGA National, Palm Beach Gardens, FL 1990 (redesign)
 TPC of Michigan, Dearborn, MI 1990
 Colleton River Plantation Club, Bluffton, SC 1991
 Dove Canyon Country Club, Dove Canyon, CA 1991
 Hanbury Manor, Ware, Hertfordshire, England  1991
 Hokkaido Classic Golf Club, Hayakita, Hokkaido, Japan  1991
 Ibis Golf & CC - Heritage, West Palm Beach, FL 1991
 Ibis Golf & CC - Legend, West Palm Beach, FL 1991
 Legacy Golf Links, Aberdeen, NC 1991
 Mission Hills Golf Club - Kanchanaburi, Thamuang, Kanchanaburi, Thailand  1991
 Mount Juliet, Thomastown, County Kilkenny, Ireland  1991
 Paris International Golf Club, Paris, France  1991
 The Club at Nevillewood, Nevillewood, PA 1992
 Damai Indah Golf & Country Club, Jakarta, Banten, Indonesia  1992
 Glenmoor Country Club, Canton, OH 1992
 Great Waters at Reynolds Plantation, Greensboro, GA 1992
 Hananomori Golf Club, Ohira, Miyagi, Japan  1992
 Huis Ten Bosch Country Club, Seihi, Nagasaki, Japan  1992
 Komono Golf Club, Komono, Mie, Japan  1992
 Laem Chabang International Country Club, Sriracha, Chonburi, Thailand  1992 
 Manila Southwoods Golf & Country Club - Legends, Carmona, Cavite, Philippines  1992
 Natural Park Ramindra Golf Club, Klongsamwa, Bangkok, Thailand  1992
 New Albany Country Club, New Albany, OH  1992
 The Challenge at Manele, Lanai City, HI 1993
 Chang An Golf & Country Club, Hukou, Hsinchu, Taiwan  1993
 Chung Shan Hot Spring Golf Club, Zhongshan City, Guangdong, China  1993
 Country Club of the North, Beavercreek, OH 1993
 Gleneagles Hotel - The PGA Centenary Course, Auchterarder, Perthshire, Scotland  1993
 Golden Bear Golf Club at Indigo Run, Hilton Head Island, SC 1993
 Leo Palace Resort Manenggon Hills, Barrigada, GMF, Guam  1993
 Manila Southwoods Golf & Country Club - Masters, Carmona, Cavite, Philippines  1993
 The Medallion Club, Westerville, OH 1993
 Mission Hills Khao Yai Golf Club, Pak Chong, Nakhon Ratchasima, Thailand  1993
 Palmilla Golf Club, Los Cabos, Baja California Sur, Mexico  1993
 Santa Lucia River Club at Ballantrae, Port St. Lucie, FL 1993
 Sendai Minami Golf Club, Shibat-gun, Miyagi-ken, Japan  1993
 Springfield Royal Country Club, Cha-Am, Phetchaburi, Thailand  1993
 Sungai Long Golf & Country Club, Kajang, Selangor, Malaysia  1993
 Barrington Golf Club, Aurora, OH 1994
 Cabo del Sol - Ocean Course, Cabo San Lucas, Baja California Sur, Mexico  1994
 Castlewoods Country Club - The Bear, Brandon, MS 1994
 Ishioka Golf Club, Ogawa, Ibaraki, Japan  1994
 London Golf Club - The Heritage, Ash, Kent, England  1994
 London Golf Club - The International Course, Ash, Kent, England  1994
 Miramar Linkou Golf & Country Club, Linkou Hsiang, Taipei, Taiwan  1994
 Mission Hills Golf Club - World Cup Course, Guanlan Town, Shenzhen, China  1994
 Montecastillo Hotel & Golf Resort, Jerez, Cadiz, Spain  1994
 The Zenzation, Pak Chong, Nakhon Ratchasima, Thailand  1994
 Borneo Golf & Country Club, Bongawan, Sabah, Malaysia  1995
 Bukit Darmo Golf Club, Surabaya, Indonesia  1995
 Eagle Bend Golf Club - Championship Course, Big Fork, MT 1995
 Emeralda Golf & Country Club - Plantation North Course, Cimanngis, Bogor, Indonesia  1995
 La Gorce Country Club, Miami Beach, FL 1995 (redesign)
 Le Robinie Golf & Sporting Club, Solbiate Olona, Varese, Italy  1995
 Mission Hills Golf Club - Valley Course, Guanlan Town, Shenzhen, China  1995
 President Country Club, Tochigi, Tochigi, Japan  1995
 Sanyo Golf Club, Okayama, Japan  1995
 Tamarin Santana Golf Club, Batam, Riau, Indonesia  1995
 Williamsburg National, Williamsburg, VA  1995
 Bearpath Golf & Country Club, Eden Prairie, MN 1996
 Bukit Barisan Country Club at Medan, Medan, Sumatera Utara, Indonesia  1996
 Country Club Bosques, Hidalgo, Distrito Federal, Mexico  1996
 Desert Mountain - Apache, Scottsdale, AZ 1996
 Golf Club at Indigo Run, Hilton Head Island, SC 1996
 The Golf Club of Purchase, Purchase, NY 1996
 Hammock Creek Golf Club, Palm City, FL 1996
 Hertfordshire Golf & Country Club, Hertfordshire, England  1996
 Hibiki no Mori Country Club, Kurabuchi, Gunma, Japan  1996
 Hualalai Golf Club, Kailua-Kona, HI 1996
 Lakelands Golf Club, Robina, Queensland, Australia  1996
 Nicklaus North Golf Course, Whistler, British Columbia, Canada  1996
 Rokko Kokusai, Kobe, Hyogo, Japan  1996
 Ruby Hill Golf Club, Pleasanton, CA 1996
 Southshore at Lake Las Vegas, Henderson, NV 1996
 Sun Belgravia Golf Club, Nukata, Aichi, Japan  1996
 Top of the Rock Golf Course, Ridgedale, MO 1996
 Aspen Glen Golf Club, Carbondale, CO 1997
 Bintan Lagoon - Seaview Course, Bintan, Riau, Indonesia  1997
 Forest Hills Golf & Country Club, Inarawan, Antipolo, Philippines  1997
 Golf Platz Gut Larchenhof, Cologne, Germany  1997
 Great Bear Golf & Country Club, East Stroudsburg, PA 1997
 James Island, Victoria, British Columbia, Canada  1997
 Legends Golf & Country Resort, Kulai, Johor, Malaysia  1997
 Montreux Golf & Country Club, Reno, NV 1997
 Old Works Golf Course, Anaconda, MT 1997
 Ruitoque Country Club, Bucaramanga, Colombia  1997
 Salem Glen Country Club, Clemmons, NC 1997
 Spring City Resort, Kunming City, Yunnan, China  1997
 Stonewolf Golf Club, Fairview Heights, IL 1997
 Suzhou Sunrise Golf Club, Suzhou, Jiangsu, China  1997
 Taman Dayu Club, Pandaan, East Java, Indonesia  1997
 Arzaga Golf Club, Drugolo di Lonato, Brescia, Italy  1998
 The Bear Trace at Cumberland Mountain, Crossville, TN 1998
 Carden Park, Cheshire, England  1998
 Classic Golf Resort - Basant Lok, Vasant Vihar, New Delhi, India  1998
 Empire Hotel & Country Club, Negara Brunei Darussalam, Jerudong, Brunei  1998
 Grand Haven Golf Club, Palm Coast, FL 1998
 J&P Golf Club, Utsonomiya, Tochigi, Japan  1998
 Laurel Springs Golf Club, Suwanee, GA 1998
 Legends West at Diablo Grande, Patterson, CA 1998
 Nanhu Country Club, Guangzhou, Guangdong, China  1998
 Pecanwood Estate, Hartebeespoort Dam, Guateng, South Africa  1998
 Phoenix Park Golf Club, Pyeongchang, Gangwon-do, South Korea  1998
 Reflection Bay Golf Club at Lake Las Vegas, Henderson, NV 1998
 Sherwood Hills Golf & Country Club, Trece Martires, Cavite, Philippines  1998
 Superstition Mountain Golf & Country Club - Prospector, Superstition Mountain, AZ 1998
 Vermont National Country Club, South Burlington, VT 1998
 Westlake Golf & Country Club, Hangzhou, Zhejiang, China  1998
 Alabang Country Club, Alabang, Muntinlupa, Philippines  1999
 Aliso Viejo Golf Club, Aliso Viejo, CA 1999
 Aston Oaks, North Bend, OH 1999
 The Bear Trace at Harrison Bay, Harrison, TN 1999
 The Bear Trace at Tims Ford, Winchester, TN 1999
 Camp John Hay, Bagio, Benguet, Philippines  1999
 The Club at Twin Eagles, Naples, FL 1999
 Coyote Creek Golf Club - Tournament Course, San Jose, CA 1999
 Desert Mountain - Chiricahua, Scottsdale, AZ 1999
 El Dorado Golf & Beach Club, San Jose del Cabo, Baja California Sur, Mexico  1999
 Estrella Mountain Ranch Golf Club, Goodyear, AZ 1999
 Four Seasons Golf Club Punta Mita, Punta Mita, Nayarit, Mexico,  1999
 The Golden Bear Club at Keene's Pointe, Windermere, FL 1999
 The Golf Club at Mansion Ridge, Monroe, NY 1999
 Grand Bear Golf Course, Saucier, MS 1999
 New Capital Golf Club, Yamaoka, Gigu, Japan  1999
 Okanagan Golf Club, Kelowna, British Columbia, Canada  1999
 Palm Island Golf Club, Hui Yang City, Guangdong, China  1999
 Palmilla Ocean Nine, San Jose del Cabo, BCS, Mexico  1999
 Punta Mita Club de Golf - Pacifico Course, Punta Mita, Nayarit, Mexico  1999
 The Roaring Fork Club, Basalt, CO 1999
 Rocky Gap Lodge & Golf Resort, Flintstone, MD 1999
 Shanghai Links Golf & Country Club, Pudong New Area, Shanghai, China  1999
 Spring Creek Ranch, Collierville, TN 1999
 Superstition Mountain Golf & Country Club - Lost Gold, Superstition Mountain, AZ 1999
 TPC Snoqualmie Ridge,  Snoqualmie, WA 1999

2000s

 Achasta Golf Club, Dahlonega, GA 2000
 Bear Creek Golf Course at Chandler, Chandler, AZ 2000
 The Bear Trace at Chickasaw, Henderson, TN 2000
 The Bear's Club, Jupiter, FL 2000
 Bear's Paw Japan Country Club, Kouga-gun, Shiga-ken, Japan  2000
 The Club at Porto Cima, Lake Ozark, MO 2000
 Country Club of Landfall II, Wilmington, NC 2000
 Gapyeong Benest Golf Club, Gapyeong-gun, Kyonggi-do, South Korea  2000
 Gapyeong Benest Golf Club - Nicklaus Design Course, Gapyeong-gun, Kyonggi-do, South Korea  2000
 Heritage Golf & Country Club, Melbourne, Victoria, Australia  2000
 King & Bear Golf Club - St Augustine, FL 2000
 Las Campanas - Sunset, Santa Fe, NM 2000
 The Ocean Course at Hammock Beach, Palm Coast, FL 2000
 Pasadera Country Club, Monterey, CA 2000
 Whispering Pines Golf Club, Trinity, TX 2000 
 Winghaven Country Club, O'Fallon, MO 2000
 Bear Creek Golf Course at Chandler - Short Course, Chandler, AZ 2001
 Bear Trace at Ross Creek Landing, Clifton, TN 2001
 Bear's Best Las Vegas, Las Vegas, NV 2001
 Breckenridge - Elk Nine, Breckenridge, CO 2001
 The Club at Carlton Woods, The Woodlands, TX 2001
 Coyote Creek Golf Club, Bartonville, IL 2001
 Coyote Creek Golf Club - Valley Course, San Jose, CA 2001
 Cozumel Country Club, Cozumel, Quintana Roo, Mexico  2001
 Ibis Golf & CC - Tradition, West Palm Beach, FL 2001
 Mayacama Golf Club, Santa Rosa, CA 2001
 Montreux - 3 Holes, Reno, NV 2001
 Nicklaus Golf Club at Lionsgate, Overland Park, KS 2001
 Olympic Staff Ashikaga Golf Course, Ashikaga, Tochigi, Japan  2001
 Pine Valley Golf & Country Club - Golden Bear Course, Beijing, Changping, China  2001
 Ross Creek Landing, Clifton, TN 2001
 The Summit at Cordillera, Edwards, CO 2001
 Vista Vallarta Golf Club, Puerto Vallarta, Jalisco, Mexico  2001
 WuYi Fountain Palm Golf Club, Jiangmen, Guangdong, China  2001
 Bear's Best Atlanta, Suwanee, GA 2002
 Canadas De Santa Fe, Mexico City, C.P., Distrito Federal, Mexico  2002
 Cherry Creek Country Club, Denver, CO 2002
 Cimarron Hills Country Club, Georgetown, TX 2002
 Dalhousie Golf Club, Cape Girardeau, MO 2002
 The Hills of Lakeway - The Flintrock Fans Course, Austin, TX 2002
 The Club at Hokulia, Kailua-Kona, HI 2002
 Lost Tree Club, North Palm Beach, FL 2002 (redesign)
 The Moon Palace Golf Club, Cancún, Quintana Roo, Mexico  2002
 Northern Bear Golf Club, Sherwood Park, Alberta, Canada  2002
 Pinehills Golf Club, Plymouth, MA 2002
 The Reserve at Lake Keowee, Sunset, SC 2002
 Reserve Club at Woodside Plantation, Aiken, SC 2002
 The Ritz-Carlton Golf Club and Spa, Jupiter, FL 2002
 Takaraike Golf Course, Nara, Japan  2002
 The Tradition Golf Club, Okazaki-shi, Aichi, Japan  2002
 Arabian Ranches, Dubai, United Arab Emirates  2003
 The Bear's Club Par 3, Jupiter, FL 2003
 Bear Mountain Golf & Country Club, Victoria, British Columbia, Canada  2003
 The Bull at Pinehurst Farms, Sheboygan Falls, WI 2003
 The Club at Longview, Charlotte, NC  2003
 Desert Mountain - Outlaw, Scottsdale, AZ 2003
 Mayan Palace - Riviera Maya, Riviera Maya, Quintana Roo, Mexico  2003
 Pearl Valley Golf Estate & Spa, Franschhoek, Western Cape, South Africa  2003
 Royal Palm Yacht & Country Club, Boca Raton, FL  2003
 Sagamore Club, Noblesville, IN 2003
 Angeles National Golf Club, Sunland, CA 2004
 Chapelco Golf & Resort, San Martin de los Andes, Neuquen, Argentina  2004
 The Club at Pronghorn, Bend, OR 2004
 Laguna Del Mar, Puerto Penasco, Sonora, Mexico  2004
 May River Club, Bluffton, SC 2004
 Mission Hills Phuket Golf Resort & Spa, Talang, Phuket, Thailand  2004
 Old Greenwood, Truckee, CA 2004
 Toscana Country Club, Indian Wells, CA 2004
 Traditions Club, Bryan, TX 2004
 Tres Marias Residencial Golf Club, Morelia, Michoacan, Mexico  2004
 Bay Creek, Cape Charles, VA 2005
 Bay Point Golf Club, Panama City Beach, FL 2005 (redesign)
 Bayside Resort Golf Club, Selbyville, DE 2005
 The Bridges Golf & Country Club, Montrose, CO 2005
 Champions Retreat Golf Club - Bluffs Course, Augusta, GA  2005
 The Cliffs at Walnut Cove, Asheville, NC 2005
 Club Polaris Golf Resort, Seoul, South Korea  2005
 Escena, Palm Springs, CA  2005
 Machynys Peninsula Golf Club, Carmarthenshire, Wales  2005
 Moon Palace - 3rd Nine, Cancun, Quintana Roo, Mexico  2005
 Olympic Country Club - Lake Tsuburada, Misato-cho, Saitama Prefecture, Japan  2005
 Palisades Country Club, Charlotte, NC 2005
 Simola Golf & Country Lodge, Knysna, South Africa  2005
 Toscana Country Club - North, Indian Wells, CA 2005
 The Broadmoor Golf Club, Colorado Springs, CO 2006
 Cordillera Ranch, Boerne, TX 2006
 Dismal River Club, Mullen, NE 2006
 La Torre Golf Resort, Torre Pacheco, Murcia, Spain  2006
 North Palm Beach Country Club, North Palm Beach, FL 2006
 The Peninsula, Puerto Penasco, Sonora, Mexico  2006
 The Peninsula Golf & Country Club, Millsboro, DE 2006
 Punta Espada, Punta Cana, La Altagracia, Dominican Republic 2006

 Puntiro Golf Club, Mallorca, Spain  2006
 Real de Faula, Xeresa, Valencia, Spain  2006
 Reserve Club at St. James Plantation, Southport, NC 2006
 The Retreat Golf & Country Club, Corona, CA 2006
 Scarlet Course at Ohio State University, Columbus, OH 2006 (redesign)
 Sebonack Golf Club, Southampton, NY 2006
 Sherwood Lake Club, Thousand Oaks, CA 2006
 St. Francis Links, St. Francis Bay, South Africa  2006
 Asturiano Golf Club, Cuautla, Mexico  2007
 The Cliffs at Keowee, Sunset, SC 2007
 Club Campestre, Cabo San Lucas, Mexico  2007
 Cougar Canyon Golf Links, Trinidad, CO 2007
 El Valle Golf Resort, Torre Pacheco, Spain  2007
 The Kinloch Club/Jack Nicklaus Golf Club New Zealand, Kinloch, Noan Island, New Zealand  2007
 La Loma Club de Golf, San Luis Potosí, Mexico  2007
 Monte Rei, Faro, Portugal  2007
 Moorea Golf Resort, Moorea, French Polynesia  2007
 Nordelta, Buenos Aires, Argentina  2007
 Oak Valley Resort, Wonju, Kangwan-Do, South Korea  2007
 Old Corkscrew, Estero, FL 2007
 Pine Valley Golf & Country Club - Nicklaus Course, Beijing, Changping, China  2007
 Promontory, The Ranch Club, Park City, UT 2007
 Real de Faula II, Benidorm, Valencia, Spain  2007
 Sky 72 Golf Club - Ocean Course, Incheon, South Korea  2007
 Suzhou Sunrise II, Lumu Town, Suzhou, China  2007
 The Tradition Course Ginn Reunion Resort, Reunion, Florida 2007
 Villaitama & Villaitama II, Benidorm, Spain  2007
 Whispering Oak at Verandah Club, Ft. Myers, FL 2007
 Bear Lake Golf Club, Cashiers, NC 2008
 Bosque Real, Mexico City, Mexico  2008
 The Club at Creighton Farms, Loudoun County, VA 2008
 Coyote Springs - The Chase, Clark County, NV 2008
 Donneako Country Club, Seogwipo, Jeju Island, South Korea  2008
 El Rio Country Club, Guadalajara, Mexico  2008
 Hacienda Riquelme Golf Resort, Sucina, Spain  2008
 The Idaho Club, Sandpoint, ID 2008
 Killeen Castle Golf Resort, Dunshaughlin, Ireland  2008
 Puerto Los Cabos, Punta Gorda, Mexico  2008
 Riviera Cancun, Tecera Etapa de Cancun, Quintana Roo, Mexico  2008
 Samanah Country Club, Marrakech, Morocco  2008
 Shadow Creek, Beijing, China  2008
 Temae Resort, Tahiti, French Polynesia  2008
 Tseleevo Golf Polo Club, Moscow, Russia  2008
 Yucatan Village & Resort, Mérida, Yucatan, Mexico  2008
 Bear Mountain Resort - Valley Course, Victoria, British Columbia, Canada  2009
 Punta Mita Bahia, Punta Mita, Mexico  2009
 Red Ledges, Heber City, UT 2009
 The Ritz Carlton Golf Club, Dove Mountain, Tucson, AZ 2009
 Serengeti Golf and Wildlife Estate, Johannesburg, South Africa  2009
 The Club at 12 Oaks, Holly Springs, NC 2009
 Twelve Shores Golf Club, Logan, NM 2009

2010s

 Angel Hill, Chongqing, China  2010
 Applecross Country Club, Downingtown, PA 2010
 Cao Fei Dian Golf Club, Tangshan City, China  2010
 Condado de Alhama I, Torre Pacheco, Spain  2010
 Fyre Lake National, Sherrard, IL 2010
 Penati Golf Resort - Legend Course, Senica, Slovakia  2010
 Hampton Pointe at New River, Hilton Head, SC 2010
 Houghton Golf Club, Johannesburg, South Africa  2010
 Jack Nicklaus Golf Club Korea, Songdo City, South Korea  2010
 Kingrun Nanshan Golf Club, Chongqing, China  2010
 Las Terrazas de La Torre Golf Resort, Torre Pacheco, Spain  2010
 Mar Menor Golf Resort, Torre Pacheco, Spain  2010
 Mayan Palace Puerto Penasco II, Puerto Penasco, Mexico  2010
 Magnolia Green Golf Club, Moseley, VA 2010
 Paradise Ranch Resort, Grants Pass, OR 2010
 Pine Valley Executive Course, Beijing, China  2010
 Timber Banks Golf Club, Baldwinsville, NY 2010
 Westham Golf Club at Magnolia Green, Chesterfield Co., VA 2010
 Yeoju Grand CC, Yeoju, Kyunggi-do, South Korea  2010
 The Golf Club at Harbor Shores, Benton Harbor, Michigan 2010
 Fyre Lake Golf  Club, Sherrard, IL 2011
 Rock Creek Golf Club, Gordonville, TX 2011
 Kalhaar Blues & Greens Golf Club, Ahmedabad, India  2012
 Summit Rock, Horseshoe Bay, TX 2012
 Potomac Shores Golf Club, Potomac Shores, VA 2014
 The Reserve at Moonlight Basin, Big Sky, MT 2015
 Trump Golf Links Ferry Point, Bronx, NY 2015
 Major Series of Putting, Las Vegas, NV 2016
 Naples Beach Hotel and Golf Resort, Naples, FL 2016
 Baha Mar, Nassau, Bahamas 2017
 Owl's Nest Resort, Thornton, NH 2018
 American Lake Veterans Golf Course, Tacoma, WA 2019
 Golden Cub Mini Golf, Jupiter, FL 2019
 Montecito Country Club, Santa Barbara, California, 2019 

 Valley of the Eagles, Elyria, OH  2018 
 Wood River Country Club, Wood River, NE United States Coming Spring 2022

To Be Determined 
 Bear Creek at Burrus Ridge, Nashville, TN TBD
 Bear's Best Cheongna, Cheongna Golf District, Incheon, South Korea TBD
 Beihai II, Beihai, Silver Beach, China  TBD
 Buenaventura Golf Club, Farallón, Coclé, Panama  TBD
 Campeche Playa Golf Marina & Spa Resort, Campeche, Yucatan Peninsula, Mexico  TBD
 Cana Bay Golf Club, Punta Cana, La Altagracia, Dominican Republic TBD

 Cap Cana Bluffs Course, Punta Cana, La Altagracia, Dominican Republic TBD
 Cap Cana - Las Iguanas, La Altagracia, Dominican Republic  TBD

 Chambord Country Club, Paris, France  TBD
 Chiba National Golf Club, Chiba, Japan  TBD
 Chongming Island Golf Club, Chenjia Town, Chongming County, China  TBD
 Ciputra Hanoi International Golf Club, Hanoi, Vietnam  TBD
 Collina Tinta, Hurricane, UT TBD
 Condado de Alhama II, Torre Pacheco, Spain  TBD
 Condado de Alhama III, Torre Pacheco, Spain  TBD
 Coyote Springs, Clark County, NV TBD
 Coyote Springs 2nd Clark County, NV TBD
 Coyote Springs 3rd Clark County, NV TBD
 Cristallago, Lakeport, CA TBD
 Dalquharran Castle, South Ayrshire, Scotland  TBD
 Deqing New Century, Zhejiang Province, China  TBD
 Dneprovskaya Riviera, Kyiv, Ukraine  TBD
 EnVain SeniorTown, Chuncheon, Kangwan-do, South Korea  TBD
 Fazenda Serrazul, Fazenda SerrAzul, Brazil  TBD
 Forest Lakes Country Club, Halifax, Nova Scotia, Canada  TBD
 Fusong, Baishan City, Jilin Province, China  TBD
 Grand Phnom Penh Golf Club, Phnom Penh, Cambodia  TBD
 Grandvista, Maricopa County, AZ TBD
 Guacalito Golf Club, Rivas, Nicaragua  TBD
 Guanacaste Country Club, Liberia, Costa Rica  TBD
 Guiyang Golf Club, Guiyang, Guangxi, China  TBD
 Hai Xi International Golf Course, Ma Yang Xi Ecotourism Area, Fujian Province, China  TBD
 Headwaters Golf Club, Granby, CO TBD
 Heawon, Gangwon-Do, South Korea  TBD
 Hunest Golf Resort, Hong Cheon, Kangnam-do, South Korea  TBD
 Ibar Golf Club, Dolna Bania, Sofia Region, Bulgaria  TBD
 Jack Nicklaus Golf Club Anguilla, Anguilla, British West Indies  TBD
 Jack Nicklaus Golf Club of the Bahamas, Royal Island, Bahamas  TBD
 Jack Nicklaus Golf Club Patagonia, Bariloche, Argentina  TBD
 Jack Nicklaus Golf Club St. Lucia, Point Hardy, St. Lucia, British West Indies  TBD
 Jakarta Golf Club, Jakarta, Indonesia  TBD
 Jeffrey's Bay, Jeffrey's Bay, South Africa  TBD
 Jiangsu, Jurong City, Jiangsu Province, China  TBD
 Jin Hae, JinHae, Kynungsangnam-do, South Korea  TBD
 Jinhai Lake Resort, Pinggu District, Beijing, China  TBD
 Karibana, Cartagena, Colombia  TBD
 Kilada Hills, Kilada, Greece  TBD
 Kingman Arizona, Kingman, AZ TBD
 Kobe Country Club, Kobe, Japan  TBD
 Kuaradé, Luis Correia, Piauí, Brazil  TBD
 Kunming Country Club, Kumming, China  TBD
 Limni Golf Resort, Pafos, Cyprus  TBD
 Long Phuoc Golf Course, Ho Chi Minh City, Vietnam  TBD
 Los Canales de plottier Patagonia Golf and Resort, Neuquén, Argentina  TBD
 Ludhiana, Ludhiana, India  TBD
 Maya Island, Abu Dhabi, United Arab Emirates  TBD
 Mayan Palace - Nuevo Vallarta, Nuevo Vallarta, Mexico  TBD
 Mayazama, Tulum, Mexico  TBD
 Meletse, Waterberg, South Africa  TBD
 Monsaraz, Monsaraz, Portugal  TBD
 Palm Hills Golf Club & Resort, Cairo, Egypt  TBD
 Papua New Guinea, Bootless Bay, New Guinea  TBD
 Patagonia Virgin, Frutillar, Tenth Region, Chile  TBD
 Penasco Bay, Puerto Penasco, Mexico  TBD
 Peninsula Papagayo, Costa Rica  TBD
 Pielsticker/Raevo, Moscow, Russia  TBD
 Pilará, Pilar, Argentina  TBD
 Porto Mariccio, Istrian Peninsula, Republic of Croatia  TBD
 Punta Gorda, Puerto Los Cabos resort, San José del Cabo, Baja California, Mexico  TBD
 Queens Gap Golf Club, Lake Lure, NC TBD
 Quivira Los Cabos, Cabo San Lucas, BCS, Mexico  TBD
 Red Ledges Par 3, Heber City, UT, 2016 

 Rothbury Country Resort, Cessnock, New South Wales, Australia  TBD
 Royal Maluti, Clarens, Fee State, South Africa  TBD
 Sabana Falls Golf Course, El Salto, Liberia, Costa Rica  TBD
 Safisa Palace, Antalya, Turkey  TBD
 Salamansa Sands, Sao Vicente, Cape Verde  TBD
 Santa Maria Golf & Country Club, Panama City, Panama  TBD
 Sanya Resort & Golf Club, Li Race Autonomous County, Hainan Province, China  TBD
 Seaside Mariana Spa & Golf Resort, Pochomil, Nicaragua  TBD
 Serra de Santa Clara, Sao Paulo, Brazil  TBD
 Shin Do Golf Club, Chuncheon, Kangwan-do, South Korea  TBD
 Sitia Bay, Sitia Bay, Greece  TBD
 Soto de Mozanaque, Golf La Moraleja, Alcobendas, Madrid, Spain  TBD
 St. Elisabeth Golf Resort, Limassol, Cyprus  TBD
 St. Petersburg, St. Petersburg, Russia  TBD
 Tae Woong Golf Club, Hong Cheon, Kangnam-do, South Korea  TBD
 Tramore, Waterford, Ireland  TBD
 Trellis Bay, Tortola, British Virgin Islands  TBD
 Tripoli Golf Club, Tripoli, Libya  TBD
 Tuscany Hills, Copperopolis, CA TBD
 Ullna Golf Club, Roslagsvagen, Akersberga, Sweden  TBD
 Ury Estate, Stonehaven, Scotland  TBD
 Valle Del Golf, Cordoba, Argentina  TBD
 Veracruz Intra, Veracruz, Mexico  TBD
 Viveros Resort - Las Perlas Panama, Isla Viveros, Archipielago de Las Perlas, Panama  TBD
 Windrose, Pawling, NY TBD
 Xi'an Golf Club, Xi'an City, Shanxi Province, China  TBD
 Xiaoshan New Century, Zhejiang Province, China  TBD
 Yasmine Golf Club, Hammamet, Tunisia  TBD
 Zacatecas, Zacatecas, Mexico  TBD

References

 
Golf Courses Designed By Jack Nicklaus
Nicklaus